Luna Petunia is an live action/animated television series co-produced by Saban Brands, BrainPower Studio and Cirque du Soleil Media. The series premiered on Netflix on December 9, 2016. It follows the adventures of a little girl named Luna Petunia who plays in a dreamland where she learns how to make the impossible possible. Season 2 was released on July 7, 2017. Season 3 was released on November 17, 2017.

It was followed by Luna Petunia: Return to Amazia on February 2, 2018. Season 2 was released on July 20, 2018.

On May 1, 2018, Saban Brands sold Luna Petunia to Hasbro.

The series made its television debut on Discovery Family on July 1, 2019. The series aired until September 2020.

Cast
Ciara Alexys as Luna 
Ana Araujo as Luna (Live action)
Cory Doran as Sammy Stretch
Katie Griffin as Bibi Bubbles
Jonah Wineberg as Karoo
James Kee as Chef Zesto
Eddie Glen as Donnie Doohickey
Steph Lynn Robinson as Zoom Shine

Episodes

Season 1 (2016)
 "Amazing Amazia Rainbow"
 "The Fuzzlings" / "Now We're Cooking"
 "Grumpy Volcano" / "Shadow Show"
 "Star Dust" / "Popcorn Storm"
 "The Crystal Queen" / "Seahorse Hero"
 "Lost Land" / "Boom Shine"
 "The Show Must Go On" / "Great Train Chase"
 "Wishy Swishy Wishing Well" / "Painting Day"
 "Take Off Your Dancing Shoes" / "Dream Boat"
 "Sammy's Grammy" / "Melvin's Magical Mix-up"
 "Happy Jollydays"

Season 2 (2017)
 "Creepy Castle" / "Gemhenge"
 "Queen Luna" / "Cloudy with a Chance of Balloons"
 "Perfect Picnic" / "Bad Bubble Blues"
 "Karoo the Great and Powerful" / "Fellinocchio"
 "Lights Camera Sammy" / "Tricky Situation"

Season 3 (2017)
 "A Big Stretch" / "Learning to Fly"
 "Lil' Rooey" / "How Does Your Garden Grow"
 "Super Gloop" / "Perfect Toy"
 "Luna Day" / "The Big Sleep"
 "Plant Power" / "Caterball"
 "Treasure of Amazia"

Return to Amazia

Season 1 (2018)
 "Macy's Memorable Morning" / "The Curious Case of the Color Catastrophe"
 "Fumble Cat" / "Sammy Gets A Big Head"
 "Keep Calm and Karoo On" / "Runaway Tree"
 "Warm and Fuzzling" / "Gift Horse"
 "What a Racquet" / "Petunia Sitter"

Season 2 (2018)
 "Macy's Sleepover" / "Elephant Fly"
 "Macy Takes the Lead" / "Glitterlympics"
 "Slumber Cats" / "Picture Imperfect"
 "Bella Balloons" / "The Bubble Ball"
 "Rocking Pony Express" / "Moon Balloon"
 "When Monkeyphants Fly" / "The Trouble with Glitter Bunnies"

References

External links
 

Television series by Saban Capital Group
2010s American animated television series
2010s American black cartoons
2016 American television series debuts
2018 American television series endings
2010s Canadian animated television series
2010s Canadian black cartoons
2016 Canadian television series debuts
2018 Canadian television series endings
English-language Netflix original programming
American children's animated adventure television series
American children's animated fantasy television series
American children's animated supernatural television series
Canadian children's animated adventure television series
Canadian children's animated fantasy television series
American television series with live action and animation
Canadian television series with live action and animation
American computer-animated television series
Canadian computer-animated television series
American preschool education television series
Canadian preschool education television series
Netflix children's programming
Animated television series by Netflix
Television series by Hasbro Studios
Animated television series about children
Animated television series about robots
Anime-influenced Western animated television series
Animated preschool education television series
2010s preschool education television series